Koedfoltos is a genus of moths belonging to the subfamily Thyatirinae of the Drepanidae.

Species
 Koedfoltos hackeri Laszlo, G.Ronkay, L.Ronkay & Witt, 2007
 Koedfoltos parducka Laszlo, G.Ronkay, L.Ronkay & Witt, 2007

References

 , 2007, Esperiana Buchreihe zur Entomologie 13: 1–683 

Thyatirinae
Drepanidae genera